Doom is a Japanese thrash metal band by former Zadkiel members Koh and Jouichi. Formed in Tokyo in 1985, the first line up included Takashi "Taka" Fujita (vocals/guitar), Koh "Pirarucu" Morota (fretless bass) and Jouichi "Joe"  Hirokawa (drums).

History
The group released their first EP Go Mad Yourself! in 1986, and the debut album No More Pain followed in 1987. The group gained a lot of popularity and signed to the Japanese label Invitation. The band continued to release many more albums and even played a gig in the United States at CBGB's in October 1988. On May 7, 1999, founding member Koh was found dead, having apparently drowned. They released their final album Where Your Life Lies!? in November 1999, before officially disbanding in August 2000.

In 2014, Fujita and Pazz were joined by Casbah/Skull Smash bassist Kodaira for a short 15-minute set at a tribute event for United bassist Akihiro Yokoyama, who died that May. Doom later announced they would re-form, and had their first full performance on January 12, 2015 at Club Citta in Kawasaki.

On the 14th of December, 2015, it was announced on the band's official Facebook page that they had recorded a new album called Still Can't The Dead, they revealed the artwork as well. The new album is set to be released on March 2, 2016. Later that month, the band revealed the track list on their Twitter account.

Members

Current members 
 Takashi "Taka" Fujita – vocals, guitar (1985-2000, 2014-present)
 Shigeru "Pazz" Kobayashi – drums (1990-2000, 2014-present)
 Yukiya Abe – bass (2019-present)

Former members 
 Jouichi "Joe" Hirokawa – drums (1985-1990)
 Koh "Pirarucu" Morota – bass (1985-1994; died 1999)
 Masami Chiba – bass (1994-2000)
 Takatoshi Kodaira – bass (2014-2019)

Supporting musicians 
 Yoshiki Hayashi – drums (live - 1985)
 Naruyoshi Kikuchi – saxophone (guest – 1991)

Timeline

Discography

Albums  
 No More Pain (1987)
 Complicated Mind (1988)
 Incompetent... (1989)
 Human Noise (1991)
 Doom VI – Illegal Soul (1992)
 Where Your Life Lies!? (1999)
 Still Can't The Dead (2016)

Singles  
 Why!?/Last Stand to Hell (1986)
 "Freakout" (1995)

EPs 
 Go Mad Yourself! (1986)
 Killing Field (1988)
 The Nightmare Runs with Cocobat (split ep, 1993)
 Sure with Hedgehog (split ep, 1994)

Compilations 
 No More Pain - Complete Explosionworks Session (2015)
 Instruction Manual... 1988-1991 (2016)

Compilation appearances  
 "You End.Get Up! You" - Skull Thrash Zone Vol.1 (1987)
 "Doom's Day" - Skull Thrash Zone Vol.1 (1987)
 "Will Never End" - Dance 2 Noise 003 (1992)
 "1st Wild Thrush Of Fear" - Rad (1993)
 "Parasite" - Dance 2 Noise 006 (1993)
 "The Scraps Screamed" - New Konservatiw (1994)
 "Afraid..." - Extreme Hot Candy the News from Far East Loud Scene (1994)
 "Taste" - The Nightmare Runs (1995)

Video albums 
 Insomniac Days -The History of DOOM- (2017)

External links 
 Doom Official Site
 The Doom FAQ

References 

Japanese thrash metal musical groups
Japanese musical trios
Musical groups from Tokyo
Musical groups established in 1985
Musical groups disestablished in 2000
Japanese avant-garde metal musical groups
1985 establishments in Japan